Sudarshan Agarwal  (19 June 1931 – 3 July 2019) was an Indian civil servant who served as Governor of Uttarakhand (2003–2007) and Sikkim (2007–2008).

Biography 
Sudarshan Agarwal was born in Ludhiana, and was a first class Law Graduate. He served as a Member of the National Human Rights Commission for three years. From 1981 to 1993, he was Secretary General of the Rajya Sabha.

Agarwal became Governor of Uttarakhand in January 2003. He was appointed Governor of Sikkim on 19 August 2007, left office as Governor of Uttarakhand in October 2007, and was sworn in as Governor of Sikkim on 25 October.

Sudarshan Agarwal was a unique personality, who maintained the sense of humility, simplicity and integrity. Sudarshan Agarwal served as a member of the National Human Rights Commission.

Sudarshan Agarwal was born on 19 June 1931. Sudarshan Agarwal joined the judicial service of Punjab and Delhi in 1956, after completing his education. Till 1971 he served as a judicial officer.

Shri Agarwal joined as the Rajya Sabha Secretariat in the year 1971. He served the post with distinction in various capacities till 1981. After that he was brought up to the top post of Secretary General to the Rajya Sabha. For a period of 12 years, he held this office.

In 1986, while still holding this office, he was promoted to the rank and status of cabinet Secretary to the Government of India. He was appointed to the National Human Rights Commission, after his retirement from the Rajya Sabha.

With the rank and status of a Judge of the Supreme Court, he joined the Human Rights Commission. In June 2001, he retired from the NHRC. Shri Agarwal, on 8 January 2003, was sworn in as the second Governor of the newly created state of Uttaranchal.

Sudarshan Agarwal has been significantly allied with a number of social and charitable causes, apart from holding high public office. He has been the President of the high-status Delhi Gymkhana Club for two years.

He, as a director pf Rotary International from 1987-1989, also delineated South-East Asia on the board of Rotary International and also served as the Chairman of Rotary Foundation India.

The Rotary Blood Bank, New Delhi was set up under his headship and special guidance, at a cost of over Rs 5 crores.

Shri Agarwal vigorously implicated with the efforts of Rotary to exterminate polio. He carries out this spirit of social activism to Uttaranchal too. Sudarshan Agarwal has in person monitored major developments in the state in the fields of education and health.

Two initiatives of his are "The Him Jyoti Foundation" and the "Him Karuna" . The Loomba Foundation and the Jain Samaj support these initiatives.

They are continuously striving to bring hope to the families of hundreds of praiseworthy students from the remote areas of Uttaranchal.

A state of the art blood bank - IMA Blood Bank was established in Dehradun with the support of ONGC and the Indian Medical Association after his personal involvement.

He served as trustee of the Rotary service to Humanity Awards Trust and the Rotary Manav Sewa Award Trust, Shri Agarwal has campaigned tirelessly to weed out corruption from public life.

Shri Agarwal was married to Smt. Usha Agarwal and the couple has two children, a son Rajiv Agarwal and a daughter Ritu Agarwal who are distinguished professionals in their respective careers of advertising and academics.

With a soft-spoken nature, a caring and compassionate personality, integrity and a commitment to the highest standards of public service, Shri Agarwal was an inspiration for all those who believe in the moral authority of the common citizen.

References

1931 births
2019 deaths
Politicians from Ludhiana
Governors of Uttarakhand
Governors of Sikkim